Per Mikael Gustaf Eggers (born 3 February 1951 in Undersåker, Jämtlands län, Sweden) is a Swedish actor and has starred in Hocus Pocus Alfie Atkins.

External links

1951 births
Living people
21st-century Swedish male actors
People from Jämtland